Ilingoceros is an extinct genus of pronghorn artiodactyl from the Late Miocene of North America.

At  in body length, the animal would have been slightly bigger than the related modern pronghorn. It had straight, spiraled horns, which ended in forked tips.

References

Prehistoric pronghorns
Miocene even-toed ungulates
Miocene mammals of North America
Prehistoric even-toed ungulate genera
Fossil taxa described in 1909